Gashaw Asfaw Melese (Amharic: ጋሻው አስፋው; born 26 September 1978) is an Ethiopian long-distance runner.

Ashaw won the silver medal at the 2003 All-Africa Games and finished fourteenth in the marathon at the 2007 World Championships. He has also participated in the 2005 edition, but did not finish the race.

His personal best marathon time is 2:08:03 hours, achieved in April 2006 in the Paris Marathon. In the half marathon his personal best time is 1:02:35 hours, achieved in September 2006 in Lille.

Achievements

External links

1978 births
Living people
Ethiopian male long-distance runners
Ethiopian male marathon runners
Athletes (track and field) at the 2008 Summer Olympics
Olympic athletes of Ethiopia
Paris Marathon male winners
African Games silver medalists for Ethiopia
African Games medalists in athletics (track and field)
Athletes (track and field) at the 2003 All-Africa Games
21st-century Ethiopian people